Jaime Barroso (born 15 May 1968) is a Spanish racewalker. He competed in the men's 50 kilometres walk at the 1992 Summer Olympics and the 1996 Summer Olympics.

References

1968 births
Living people
Athletes (track and field) at the 1992 Summer Olympics
Athletes (track and field) at the 1996 Summer Olympics
Spanish male racewalkers
Olympic athletes of Spain
Place of birth missing (living people)
Universiade silver medalists for Spain
Universiade medalists in athletics (track and field)
Medalists at the 1991 Summer Universiade